Helmut Bertram (20 March 1910 – 27 January 1981) was a German politician of the  and former member of the German Bundestag.

Life 
He was a member of the German Bundestag from 3 November 1949, when he succeeded Rudolf Amelunxen, until the end of the first term for the Centre Party, which from 14 December 1951 formed a parliamentary group with the Bavarian Party under the name of the Federalist Union. From 16 July 1952 to 10 December 1953 he was a member of the European Parliament.

Literature

References

1910 births
1981 deaths
Members of the Bundestag for North Rhine-Westphalia
Members of the Bundestag 1949–1953
MEPs for Germany 1958–1979